Triboniophorus is a genus of air-breathing land slugs, terrestrial pulmonate gastropod molluscs in the family Athoracophoridae, the leaf-veined slugs.

Species
Species within this genus include:
 Triboniophorus graeffei Humbert, 1863 – the red triangle slug – type species
 Triboniophorus sp. nov. 'Kaputar', a fluorescent pink species, also called Triboniophorus sp. nov. 'Kaputar' 
 incertae sedis Triboniophorus brisbanensis Pfeiffer, 1900 (anatomy at page 316.)

Description
These slugs have two, not four, tentacles, and like other leaf-vein slugs they have an indented pattern on their dorsum which resembles the veins of a leaf.

References

Athoracophoridae